Al-Karkh Sports Club is an Iraqi sports club based in Karkh, Baghdad. Its professional football team plays in the Iraqi Premier League, the top tier of the Iraqi football. The club's home stadium is Al-Saher Ahmed Radhi Stadium.

Founded in 1963, Al-Karkh was not successful in reaching the top-flight of Iraqi football until Al-Rasheed SC's properties and place in the top division were transferred to Al-Karkh when Al-Rasheed were dissolved in 1990. In 2022, Al-Karkh achieved its first Iraq FA Cup title with a 2–1 victory over Al-Kahrabaa in the final.

History 
In the late-1940s, a basketball club was established under the name of Al-Mansour Club, where a lot of national basketball players started. The team won the 1958 Adhamiya Tournament with thousands of people either celebrating in the court or crowding outside of it. In the early-1960s, the club was dissolved and its administrative board was transferred to the new Al-Karkh Sports Club which is considered as Al-Mansour's spiritual successor.

Since it was founded in 1963, Al-Karkh were unsuccessful to get promoted to the Iraq Central FA League or later the Iraqi Premier League. For 27 years, they had been languishing in the lower divisions.

Taking the Al Karkh Stadium as his club's, on 23 November 1983, Uday Hussein founded a new sports club named Al-Rasheed. Al-Rasheed soon became the strongest club in Iraq, winning the lower division in their first season followed by three top division league titles, two FA Cups, three Arab Club Champions Cup trophies and a runners-up spot at the AFC Champions League, all between 1983 and 1990.

On 18 August 1990, the Iraqi Olympic Committee decided to dissolve Al-Rasheed Sports Club and transfer all of its properties to Al-Karkh Sports Club and replacing Al-Rasheed with Al-Karkh in the Iraqi Premier League.

When Al-Karkh replaced Al-Rasheed's place in the Iraqi Premier League, the team for the first time in their history played in the top tier of Iraqi football. Most of the Iraq national team players left, retiring, like Adnan Dirjal, Haris Mohammed, and Samir Shaker, or transferring to other teams, like Ahmed Radhi, Laith Hussein, and Habib Jafar. In their first season in the senior division, 1990–91, they finished in 4th place at 38 points.

Being coached by Adnan Dirjal, Al-Karkh, on Dirjal's first season as a coach, finished in the furthest place they have ever been in the league, which is 3rd place in the 1991–92 season, three points away from the leaders. Dirjal received the best Iraqi coach award for the team's performance through the season, while Saad Qais Noaman received the best player award. Al-Karkh also finished in 4th place in the 1991 Iraqi Elite Cup.

In the seasons of 1992–93, 1993–94, 1994–95 and 1995–96, Al-Karkh managed to keep an average of 9th place in the league, where Ammo Baba, in the 1994–95 season, made the team reach the lowest he had ever reached with an Iraqi team through his entire managing career, which was 7th place. The Iraq FA Cup editions from 1992 to 1996 didn't witness Al-Karkh succeeding in passing the round of 16, while in the Iraqi Elite Cup, Al-Karkh reached 4th place in 1993.

In 1996, they participated in the 102nd edition of the IFA Shield, a competition in India. They finished as runners-up, losing 1–0 after extra time to JCT Mills. In the 1996–97 season, Al-Karkh finished in the relegation zone's 14th place at 27 points from 30 matches. The team was relegated to the Iraq Division One for the first time since they have replaced Al-Rasheed in 1990. They were promoted back to the Iraqi Premier League in the 1997–98 season. They maintained an average of 7th place throughout the five seasons after promotion. In the 1999–00 Iraq FA Cup, Al-Karkh reached the semifinals after beating Al-Talaba and Samarra FC, but they lost to Al-Quwa Al-Jawiya 1–0 in both the first and second legs. The team also reached the semifinals in the 1999 Iraqi Elite Cup, where they were beaten by Al-Quwa Al-Jawiya. They won the third place match. A season after, Al-Karkh achieved the Iraqi Elite Cup 3rd place again.

In the 2003–04 season, after Sharar Haidar was appointed as the new president of the club, Al-Karkh didn't qualify for the second phase while in the season after, the team only qualified to the second phase. They participated in the Arab Istiqlal Championship in 2005 but were knocked out at the group stage. In the 2005–06 season, Al-Karkh finished in the relegation zone with 12 points out of 12 matches, one point away from Diyala FC that had 13 points, being relegated for the second time to the Iraq Division One. The team stayed in the Division One until the 2009–10 season, where they were among the six clubs that were elected to play the last two Iraqi Premier League places playoff. Under the management of Nasrat Nassir, Al-Karkh won promotion and returned to the Premier League. After two seasons, Al-Karkh was relegated again before returning once again to the Premier League after winning Division One in the 2012–13 season.

In the 2021–22 season, Al-Karkh won their first Iraq FA Cup title with a 2–1 victory over Al-Kahrabaa in the final.

Stadium 

At first, Al-Mansour club took an old building that oversees the Tigris in Al-Karkh and turned it into a basketball court and a place to manage the club. In the late-1960s, the building started to collapse which was the main reason for the club being banished. In 1963, a new club with the same administrative board was formed in Mansour neighbourhood, Mansour district, Karkh after Al Karkh Stadium was built.

In 1984, Al-Rasheed took over the stadium and turned it into theirs after renovating it and allowing shops to be opened around it. In the dissolving of Al-Rasheed, the stadium returned to its old name as the stadium of Al-Karkh SC. The stadium's latest renovations were in 2004 along with most of the sports facilities after it was damaged by the U.S. Air Force in the Battle of Baghdad (2003).

Statistics

Recent seasons 
The season-by-season performance of the club over the recent years:

.
Rank = Rank in the league; P = Played; W = Win; D = Draw; L = Loss; F = Goals for; A = Goals against; GD = Goal difference; Pts = Points; Cup = Iraq FA Cup.
in = Still in competition; — = Not attended; 1R = 1st round; 2R = 2nd round; 3R = 3rd round; R16 = Round of sixteen; QF = Quarterfinals; SF = Semifinals.

1 The league was not completed and was cancelled.

Players

Current squad

Personnel

Current technical staff 
{| class="toccolours"
!bgcolor=silver|Position
!bgcolor=silver|Name
!bgcolor=silver|Nationality
|- bgcolor=#eeeeee
|Manager:||Hasan Ahmad||
|- bgcolor=#eeeeee
|Assistant manager:||Bahaa Kadhim||
|- 
|Goalkeeping coach:||Abdul-Karim Naim||
|-
|U-19 coach:||Ali Al-Bayati||
|-
|Director of football:||Taleb Menshed||
|-bgcolor=#eeeeee
|Technical Advisor:||Thair Ahmed||
|-bgcolor=#eeeeee
|Club doctor:||Majed Khazal||
|-

Board members

Managerial history

  Karim Salman 
  Ahmad Abdul-Jabar 
  Razzaq Farhan 
  Hassan Ahmad

Honours

Domestic 
Iraq Division One (second tier)
Winners: 2012–13, 2017–18
Iraq FA Cup
Winners: 2021–22
Iraqi Super Cup
Runners-up: 2022

International 
IFA Shield (IFA)
Runners-up: 1996

Other sports

Basketball 
Iraqi Division I Basketball League:
Champions (13): 1980–81, 1981–82, 1982–83, 1987–88, 1988–89, 1996–97, 1997–98, 1998–99, 2001–02, 2004–05, 2005–06, 2007–08, 2015–16

Notes

References

External links 
 Club's page on Goalzz.com

Football clubs in Iraq
Sport in Baghdad
1963 establishments in Iraq
Football clubs in Baghdad